Hannah Montana 2: Meet Miley Cyrus is a double album serving as the soundtrack for the second season of the television series Hannah Montana and the debut studio album by American singer Miley Cyrus. The album was released on June 26, 2007, by Walt Disney Records and Hollywood Records. Both of the albums were reissued on digital platforms as standalone albums in 2021. Both albums were further promoted with Cyrus' first headlining concert tour, the Best of Both Worlds Tour (2007–08). Most of the Meet Miley Cyrus album was produced by Rock Mafia, with further collaborations with Xandy Barry, Matthew Wilder, Scott Cutler and Wendi Foy Green. Cyrus co-wrote eight out of ten tracks on Meet Miley Cyrus.

Hannah Montana 2: Meet Miley Cyrus debuted at number one on the US Billboard 200, with first-week sales of 325,000 copies, and has since become certified triple-platinum by the Recording Industry Association of America (RIAA) for exceeding shipments of three million units. Cyrus was also the seventh solo artist to chart at number one on the Billboard 200 under the age of eighteen. The album charted well on national record charts throughout Europe and Oceania, appearing in the top-twenty in several countries. The album received a multi-platinum certification by Music Canada, platinum certifications by the Australian Recording Industry Association (ARIA) in Australia and the International Federation of the Phonographic Industry (IFPI) in Sweden, and gold certifications by the Mexican Association of Phonograph Producers (AMPROFON) in Mexico and the British Phonographic Industry (BPI) in the United Kingdom.

"Nobody's Perfect" was released as the lead single from Hannah Montana 2 on May 15, 2007, and peaked at 27 in the US, making it the second highest charting Hannah Montana single. Her second single, "Make Some Noise", was released on June 5, 2007, as a digital download. "See You Again" was released as the lead single from Meet Miley Cyrus on October 1, 2007. It peaked at number ten on the Billboard Hot 100, becoming Cyrus' first single to enter the top ten on the chart. "Start All Over" was released only in Australia on March 11, 2008, and peaked at number sixty-eight on the Billboard Hot 100.

Background and composition

During the production of the first season of Hannah Montana, Cyrus commented that "right now we're just all really focused on making Hannah Montana the show as good as it can be, but hopefully in the future there may be a Hannah Montana soundtrack [or] a Miley Cyrus album." The series itself premiered through the Disney Channel on March 24, 2006, and became an immediate commercial success; with 5.4 million viewers, the pilot episode earned the channel the highest ratings in its history at the time. The following month, it was reported that an accompanying soundtrack and Cyrus' debut studio album had both begun production, the latter of which was scheduled to be released in early 2007. The first soundtrack Hannah Montana (2006) debuted at number one with first-week sales of 286,000 copies, becoming the first television soundtrack to debut in the peak position of the chart.

In the series, Cyrus portrays the character Miley Stewart, a teenager who lives the secret double life as the pop star Hannah Montana. She stated that "most songs for the first season reflect the show, with Miley or Hannah making sure the other doesn't get caught or whatever," opining that the tracks provided series producers with the opportunity to "make sure that everyone understood the characters". By comparison, Cyrus described material used during the second season as "more speaking out to the fans." Heather Phares from AllMusic  described Cyrus' vocals on her personal tracks as being "lower and throatier" with "more organic and rock-oriented" instrumentation.

Throughout the record, Kathi Kamen Goldmark from Common Sense Media noted the inclusion of "positive, self-empowering messages for tween girls". Hannah Montana 2 continued to discuss Cyrus' double life on the program, notably in the tracks "Rock Star" and "Old Blue Jeans". Friendships are addressed during "Right Here", "You and Me Together", and "True Friend". The songs "Nobody's Perfect", "Make Some Noise", and "Life's What You Make It" discuss maintaining an optimistic outlook in life. Meet Miley Cyrus explored "more serious objects" including teen romances. Its closing track "I Miss You" is a dedication to Cyrus' late grandfather. Hannah Montana 2 was later reissued as a two-disc special edition only in Japan. It included a remix of the track "We Got the Party" with the Jonas Brothers, an acoustic version of "One in a Million", and a DVD of live performances. Meet Miley Cyrus was omitted from the re-released pressings. Meet Miley Cyrus remained unreleased as a standalone album until January 2021, when both albums were reissued separately for the first time on digital platforms.

Singles

From Hannah Montana 2
"Nobody's Perfect" was originally released on March 20, 2007, with the reissue of the original Hannah Montana soundtrack. The track was later serviced as the lead single from Hannah Montana 2, and was individually released on May 15. The song peaked at number 27 on the US Billboard Hot 100. Despite not releasing official follow-up singles, several tracks from the soundtrack charted in the United States. "Life's What You Make It" was the highest-peaking track from the record, having entered the chart at number 25. "Rock Star", "Make Some Noise", and "True Friend" charted in the lower ends of the Billboard Hot 100, having respectively reached numbers 81, 92, and 99.

From Meet Miley Cyrus
"See You Again" was released as the lead single on October 1, 2007. It became her first song to peak in the top ten in the United States when it peaked at number 10 on the Billboard Hot 100. Its "Rock Mafia Remix" was included on Cyrus' second studio album Breakout (2008), and was released on August 11, 2008, as an individual single. "Start All Over" was released only in Australia as the second single on March 11, 2008. The song peaked at number 68 in the United States. Its accompanying music video was premiered on December 14, 2007.

Promotion 

As Hannah Montana, Cyrus performed songs from Hannah Montana 2 live for the first time at the Hannah Montana: Live in London concert held at the Koko Club on March 28, 2007, in London, England. She also promoted the soundtrack performing live as the character at opening ceremony of the 2007 Disney Channel Games and at the 2007 Good Morning America Summer Concert Series.

On the following day of its release, a free concert held at the courtyard of the Hollywood and Highland Center in Los Angeles, California was used to promote the soundtrack alongside Cyrus' debut studio album, where she performed songs from both albums as Hannah Montana and as herself.

As herself, Cyrus first performed songs from Meet Miley Cyrus, "See You Again" and "G.N.O. (Girls Night Out)", at the closing ceremony of the 2007 Disney Channel Games held on April 27, 2007, which was also the first time she performed as herself and not as Hannha Montana. On December 20, 2007, Cyrus performed "I Miss You" on The Oprah Winfrey Show. On New Year's Eve, she performed "Start All Over", "See You Again" and "We Got The Party" with the Jonas Brothers at the Dick Clark's New Year's Rockin' Eve in New York City. In 2008 Cyrus performed "G.N.O. (Girls Night Out)" at the 2007 Nickelodeon Kids Choice Awards on March 29 and "See You Again" with "Good and Broken" at Idol Gives Back on April 14. She also performed "G.N.O. (Girls Night Out)" with Dr. Teeth and The Electric Mayhem at the Disney Channel featuring The Muppets' special Studio DC: Almost Live.

Tour 
Cyrus embarked on the Best of Both Worlds Tour in 2007 and 2008 in the U.S. and Canada. It primarily served as a promotional tool for Hannah Montana 2: Meet Miley Cyrus; however, "Just Like You", "Pumpin' Up the Party", "I Got Nerve", and "The Best of Both Worlds" from the original Hannah Montana soundtrack were also included in its set list. The tour proved commercially successful, having grossed $54 million by its conclusion, while its 2008 film adaption Hannah Montana and Miley Cyrus: Best of Both Worlds Concert earned $70 million. The latter was released as a Walmart-exclusive CD/DVD set, titled Best of Both Worlds Concert, in March 2008.

Critical reception

Writing for AllMusic, Heather Phares expressed concern that Cyrus was "in danger of being overshadowed by the role she plays", but complimented that incorporation of "shiny, synth-driven pop and strummy acoustic ballads", praising the album. She also noted Cyrus' "East Northumberland High" as the standout track from both discs. Kathi Kamen Goldmark from Common Sense Media opined that releasing Hannah Montana 2 and Meet Miley Cyrus as a single project was a value for the younger audience it attracted. However, she criticized its production for being "synthesized and over-processed", and added that the records would "irritate anyone with more mature musical taste." However, Bob Smithouser and Bob Waliszewski from PluggedIn provided a more favorable review, stating that the album was "a great pick for [Cyrus'] tween fan base" and compared its musical style to that of Ashlee Simpson. Shirley Halperin from Entertainment Weekly shared a similar sentiment, further comparing its sound to those of Hilary Duff and Avril Lavigne. She opined that the first disc "delivers pure pop candy and impresses with R&B-tinged ballads", while the second disc was notable for its "risk-taking" lyrics.

Commercial performance
In the United States, Hannah Montana 2: Meet Miley Cyrus challenged a number one debut on the Billboard 200 with Kelly Clarkson's My December. On July 14, Hannah Montana 2: Meet Miley Cyrus debuted at number one with first-week sales of 326,000 copies; 35,000 units ahead of My December, which charted in second place. In doing so, it surpassed the first-week sales of the original Hannah Montana soundtrack, which opened with 281,000 units the previous year. Five songs from the record appeared on the Billboard Hot 100, four of those being debuts on which three were credited to the fictional Hannah Montana and one to Miley Cyrus. The highest new entry was "Life’s What You Make It" at No. 25. In March 2008, the record reached number six the same week that Best of Both Worlds Concert reached number 10 in its second week of availability. In doing so, Cyrus became the first person with two records in the top-ten of the Billboard 200 since Ray Charles accomplished this in 2004. On 8 February 2008, the record was certified triple-platinum by the Recording Industry Association of America (RIAA) for exceeding shipments of three million copies.

The album became the 71st best performing Billboard 200 album of all time after spending a total of 65 weeks on the chart, which 23 of those being on the top-ten, and reaching numbers 16 and 11 on the Billboard 200 Year-End Chart of 2007 and 2008, respectively, and also number 112 on the Billboard 200 Decade-End Chart (2000s).

Hannah Montana 2: Meet Miley Cyrus opened at number three on the Canadian Albums Chart, and was recognized with a platinum certification in the country. It also charted at number 18 on the Top 100 Mexico, where it was later certified gold. The record performed well throughout Europe. Its highest peak in the continent was on the Norwegian VG-lista, where it reached number eight. It also reached the top twenty on the Ö3 Austria Top 40, the Danish Tracklisten, the Portuguese Albums Chart, and the Swedish Sverigetopplistan. It charted lower on the German Media Control Charts, the Swiss Hitparade, and the French SNEP, where it respectively reached numbers 47, 69, and 178. The record peaked at number 46 on the Spanish PROMUSICAE, and was also certified gold in the United Kingdom by the British Phonographic Industry. The album reached number 50 on the Swedish Sverigetopplistan. In Oceania, Hannah Montana 2: Meet Miley Cyrus respectively charted at numbers 20 and 6 on the Australian ARIA Charts and the Official New Zealand Music Chart. In the former country, it was certified platinum. As of 2014, it was estimated that the album has sold around 9.8 million copies worldwide.

Track listing

Notes
  signifies a co-producer

Credits and personnel
Credits adapted from AllMusic.

 Antenna – production
 Antonina Armato – production
 Xandy Barry – background vocals, guitar, keyboards, mixing, production, vocals
 Doug Boehm – engineering
 Michael Bradford – production
 Paul Bushnell – bass
 Greg Collins – engineering
 Greg Critchley – drums
 Dorian Crozier – drum programming, drums, engineering, production
 Scott Cutler – guitar
 Miley Cyrus – primary artist, background vocals
 Kara DioGuardi – background vocals, production
 Fefe Dobson – background vocals
 Andy Dodd – guitar, keyboards, mixing, production, programming
 Josh Freese – drums
 Jens Gad – guitar
 Toby Gad – bass, engineering, guitar, keyboards, mixing, production, programming
 Wally Gagel – bass guitar, production
 Steve Gerdes – creative direction
 Matthew Gerrard – arrangement, bass, guitar, keyboards, mixing, production, programming
 Steve Hammons – engineering
 James Harrah – guitar
 Jamie Houston – background vocals, drum programming, engineering, mixing, producer
 Sean Hurley – bass
 Tim James – mixing, production
 Buck Johnson – keyboards
 Stacy Jones – drums
 Abe Laboriel, Jr. – drums
 David Levita – guitar
 Jon Lind – A&R
 Nigel Lundemo – engineering
 Marco Marinangeli – arrangement, mixing, production
 Dani Markman – A&R
 Hannah Montana – primary artist
 Jason Morey – executive producer
 Jamie Muhoberac – keyboards
 Clif Norrell – mixing
 Paul Palmer – mixing
 Geoff Pearlman – guitar
 Shelly Peiken – background vocals
 Csaba Petocz – engineering
 Tim Pierce – guitar
 Anne Preven – background vocals
 Nicholas Rodriguez – bass
 Ashley Saunig – vocals
 Eddy Schreyer – mastering
 Jeff Turzo – keyboards
 Steve Vincent – executive in charge of music
 Robert Vosgien – mastering
 Windy Wagner – background music
 Adam Watts – drums, mixing, production, programming
 Greg Wells – mixing, production
 Matthew Wilder – engineering, guitar, keyboards, mixing, production

Charts

Weekly charts

Year-end charts

Decade-end charts

All-time charts

Certifications

Disney's Karaoke Series

Disney's Karaoke Series: Hannah Montana 2 is a karaoke album released by Walt Disney Records on June 12, 2008. It is composed of eight tracks from Hannah Montana 2, which are credited to Hannah Montana. Each track is included in both instrumental and vocal versions.

Track listing

Charts

Artist Karaoke Series

Artist Karaoke Series is a karaoke album released by Walt Disney Records on May 20, 2008. It is composed of eight instrumental tracks from Meet Miley Cyrus, which are credited to Miley Cyrus. It omitted two other songs from the original album, "Clear" and "Good and Broken".

Track listing

Charts

See also
 List of Billboard 200 number-one albums of 2007

References

2007 debut albums
2007 soundtrack albums
Albums produced by Matthew Gerrard
Albums produced by Rock Mafia
Albums produced by Toby Gad
Hannah Montana albums
Hollywood Records albums
Miley Cyrus albums
Walt Disney Records soundtracks